Catalin Baciu (born 26 August 1988) is a Romanian basketball player for CSM Oradea of the Liga Națională and the Romanian national team.

He participated at the EuroBasket 2017.

References

1988 births
Living people
Centers (basketball)
CS Universitatea Cluj-Napoca (men's basketball) players
CSM Oradea (basketball) players
Romanian men's basketball players
Sportspeople from Cluj-Napoca